Robert E. Hanson (August 26, 1947 – February 4, 2015) was a North Dakota Democratic-NPL politician who served as the North Dakota State Treasurer  from 1979 to 1980 and from 1985 to 1992 and as North Dakota Tax Commissioner from 1993 to 1996.

Background
Born in Jamestown, North Dakota, Hanson served in the United States Army during the Vietnam War and then received his bachelor's degree from North Dakota State University. He died in Fargo, North Dakota.

References

1947 births
2015 deaths
People from Jamestown, North Dakota
North Dakota State University alumni
State treasurers of North Dakota
North Dakota Tax Commissioners
United States Army soldiers